Football events were contested at the 2007 Summer Universiade in Bangkok, Thailand.

References
 Universiade football medalists on HickokSports

2007 in association football
Football
2007
2007
2007 in Thai football